The 2012 King Cup of Champions, or The Custodian of the Two Holy Mosques Cup, was the 37th season of King Cup of Champions since its establishment in 1957, and the 5th under the current edition. Al-Ahli were the defending champions.

Al-Ahli won the title for the second time in a row and their twelfth title overall after beating Al-Nassr 4–1 in the final.

Participating teams

* Number of appearance in King Cup of Champions since the 2008 season .

Fixtures and results

Bracket

Quarter-finals
Quarter-finals were played on 22, 23, 26, 27, 28, 29 April & 1 May 2012.

First Leg

Second Leg

Semi-finals
Semi-finals were played on 7, 8, 11, & 14 May 2012.

First Leg

Second Leg

Third place
Third place game was played on 17 May 2012.

Final

Winner

Top scorers

References

2012
2011–12 in Saudi Arabian football
2011–12 domestic association football cups